Raw Nerve is a film production company. Members of Raw Nerve include Eli Roth, Scott Spiegel, and Boaz Yakin.

Raw Nerve has produced 2001 Maniacs, Hostel, and Hostel: Part II.

References

Film production companies of the United States
Entertainment companies established in 2004